Louis Bostedo (1798 - 1878) was an American businessman from Weyauwega, Wisconsin who spent a single term in 1856 as a member of the Wisconsin State Assembly from a district which encompassed the sparsely populated Oconto, Outagamie, Shawano and Waupaca counties.

He was born in New Jersey and was a partner in a mill and dam. Bostedo came to Waupaca County in 1851, being one of the first settlers of Weyauwega. In 1855 he was a member of the Waupaca County Board of Supervisors from Weyauwega. He was the first village president of Waupaca.

Legislative election and service 
The seat was initially awarded to one William Brunquest, whom Bostedo successfully challenged, with both claimants admitting that Bostedo had received the majority of the vote.

He was a Democrat, succeeded fellow Democrat Perry H. Smith, and was succeeded by Democrat Benjamin F. Phillips.

After the Assembly 
Bostedo remained on the County Board; was a founder and President of the Old Settlers' Society of Waupaca County when that body organized in 1872, retaining the office until his death in 1878.

He was reported as a newly elected Vice-President of the Ripon and Wolf River Rail Road Company in 1858. That railroad had been chartered by the legislature during his term of office.

References 

1878 deaths
Businesspeople from Wisconsin
County supervisors in Wisconsin
Mayors of places in Wisconsin
People from New Jersey
People from Weyauwega, Wisconsin
1798 births
19th-century American politicians
19th-century American businesspeople
Democratic Party members of the Wisconsin State Assembly